Shelabolikha is a rural locality (a selo) and the administrative center of Shelabolikhinsky Selsoviet and Shelabolikhinsky District, Altai Krai, Russia. The population was 3,780 in 2016. There are 49 streets.

Geography 
The village is located 86 km west from Barnaul on the Ob River.

References 

Rural localities in Shelabolikhinsky District